HNLMS Van Galen was a N-class destroyer built for the Royal Navy during the Second World War and transferred to the Royal Netherlands Navy shortly after completion. The Dutch changed the pennant numbers several times G-84 (WW II), J-3, JT-3, and D-803.

Description
The N-class destroyers were repeats of the J-class, except that they incorporated the wartime modifications made to the earlier ships. They were powered by Parsons geared steam turbines, each driving one propeller shaft, using steam provided by two Admiralty three-drum boilers. Their complement was 183 officers and ratings.

The main armament of the N-class ships were six 4.7-inch (120 mm) Mark XII guns in three twin-gun mounts, two superfiring in front of the bridge and one aft of the superstructure. The rear torpedo tube mount was replaced by a single QF  Mk V anti-aircraft gun. Their light anti-aircraft suite consisted of one quadruple mount for 2-pounder  guns, four single  Oerlikon guns and two twin mounts for Vickers  anti-aircraft machineguns. The N-class ships were fitted with one above-water quintuple mount for  torpedoes and two depth charge throwers and one rack for 45 depth charges.

Construction and career
Van Galen was built as the British destroyer HMS Noble (G84), but was commissioned into the Royal Netherlands Navy shortly after completion. The ship served throughout the Second World War and was stricken in October 1956 and scrapped in February 1957 in the Netherlands.

Notes

References

External links 

 

J, K and N-class destroyers of the Royal Navy
Ships built on the River Clyde
1941 ships
World War II destroyers of the United Kingdom
N-class destroyers of the Royal Netherlands Navy
World War II destroyers of the Netherlands